Drumbo is a small village, townland and civil parish in County Down, Northern Ireland. It is in the historic barony of Castlereagh Upper.

The 2001 Census recorded the village's population as 408.

The village is set on the edge of a ridge where the drumlin country of County Down starts to descend into the Lagan Valley. It is laid out around a junction of routes meeting at the front of the Presbyterian Church, which is a listed building. The current church building is beside the site of the medieval parish church, the foundations of which can be seen in the graveyard, as can the lower half of the truncated Drumbo round tower, a scheduled historic monument. The round tower was originally built here to take advantage of the panoramic views over the Lagan Valley. At the time of the tower's construction, these views would have been useful in spotting oncoming Viking raiders. The tower formed part of a monastery.

The area is designated in the DOE (NI) area development plan as an 'area of outstanding scenic amenity value'. The village lies on the southern edge of the Lagan Valley Area of Outstanding Natural Beauty, while the northern part of the townland lies within it.

A feature in the heart of the village is a wrought iron pump with a distinctive double wheel crank mounted at the junction. This forms the centre of the village adjacent to the presbyterian church, round tower and village hall. Directly opposite this pump is the building which was for many years the post office for the village. A short distance South of this a blacksmith's foundry operates.

Civil parish of Drumbo
The civil parish includes the urban area of Carryduff.

Townlands
The civil parish includes the following townlands:

Ballycarn
Ballycarngannon
Ballycowan
Ballydollaghan
Ballylesson
Ballymacbrennan
Ballynagarrick
Ballynahatty
Ballynavally
Cargacroy
Carr
Carryduff
Clogher
Clontonakelly
Creevy
Crossan
Drennan
Drumbo
Drumra
Edenderry
Hillhall
Knockbreckan
Legacurry
Leveroge
Lisnastrean
Lisnode
Mealough
Tullyard

See also
List of civil parishes of County Down
List of townlands in County Down
Drumbo round tower

References

NI Neighbourhood Information System
Draft Belfast Metropolitan Area Plan 2015
Parish of Drumbo

External links

Drumbo Presbyterian Church

 
Townlands of County Down
Villages in County Down